Bernard Lemaire,  (born May 6, 1936) is a Canadian businessman. He was the Chairman of the Board of Cascades Inc., a Canadian manufacturer of packaging products, tissue products and fine papers products.

Biography
Born in Drummondville, Quebec,  he studied civil engineering at the Université de Sherbrooke and McGill University. In 1960, he joined the family recycling business, Drummond Pulp and Fiber. In 1963, along with his father and brother, Laurent, he founded Papier Cascades Inc. (which later became Cascades Inc.). He was President and Chief Executive Officer of the company until 1992.

Under Lemaire's presidency Cascades grew from a small paper mill in Kingsey Falls, Quebec, into a multi-national company with 90 plants and 11,000 employees in Canada, the United States and France.

In 1987, he was made an Officer of the Order of Canada, the centrepiece of Canada's honours system which recognizes a lifetime of achievement and merit of a high degree, especially in service to Canada or to humanity at large. In 2002, he was awarded the Chevalier de l'Ordre national de la Légion d'honneur of France.

Upon his retirement from Cascades, Lemaire began a cattle ranch that quickly grew to 1,000 head of highland cattle. He continues to market his natural, hormone-free cattle at the local grocery stores, IGA, Avril Health Supermarkets, butchers and restaurants.

References

1936 births
Living people
Canadian businesspeople
Officers of the Order of Canada
Papermakers
People from Drummondville